The Invasion of Curaçao in 1800 during the War of the Second Coalition was launched by French forces against the Batavian Republic. The French had landed on the island on 22 July, and on 5 September attacked and captured a fort protecting the town of Willemstad, Curaçao. The American consul sent for help, and on 10 September the Dutch governor of the island surrendered to a British frigate, under the command of Frederick Watkins. On 22 September the American sloops  and  arrived, and on 23 September the Patapsco sailed into the harbor and landed troops to reinforce the garrison protecting the town. On 23 September and 24 September the French fired upon the defenders, consequently exchanging cannon and musket fire with them throughout the day and night. Though it appeared a French assault was imminent, French forces left the island during the night. Significantly, the French suffered many killed or wounded in contrast to two American wounded. The British took control of the island, and American forces sailed away.

Background
The island of Curaçao was important to American merchants in the Caribbean, and ships had been stationed near there to guard American interests since the start of the Quasi-War. The sloop  was ordered to sail there in May 1800, and arrived in June and left soon afterwards. No American warships were stationed at Curaçao on 23 July when a French force from Guadeloupe, consisting of five ships and 1,400 troops, sailors, and Guadeloupean militia, arrived . The French forces landed and their commander demanded the surrender of the forts, which Governor Johan Lausser refused.

Siege
An additional 10 vessels with more sailors and men had landed by 5 September, when the French forces attacked the forts protecting Willemstad, capturing one and sending a note threatening to attack Americans.

Meanwhile, the British had sent the frigate  under Frederick Watkins to the island to prevent its capture by the French. On 10 September Nereide arrived at the eastern point of Curaçao and there chased away two privateers that the French commander had left cruising as pickets. After these vessels retreated into a bay that contained a further 15 privateers, Watkins sailed to Willemstad where he began engaging various targets that were firing from the town. An American merchantman soon informed the British of the situation and that the Dutch were willing to capitulate to the British in exchange for protection. The British landed a force of twenty marines and accepted Governor Lassuer's surrender three days later. The French still held two forts near the town, and on 22 September, prior to the arrival of the American forces, the French commander had demanded the surrender of the town within 24 hours.

Battle
On 23 September, to save the town and protect American property, Patapsco sailed into the harbor, landed her marines, reinforced with twenty marines from Merrimack. The troops also manned a gun battery and fanned out through the town. At approximately 17:00 the French forts and men fired upon the defending forces, which the cannon of Patapsco answered along with the muskets and cannons of the defending forces. Two Americans were wounded; French casualties amounted to 150 men killed or wounded.

On 24 September, the French again exchanged cannon and musket fire with the defending forces; the volume of French fire led the defenders to expect an assault on the town. However, during the night the French abandoned their positions and sailed away.

Aftermath
On the morning of 25 September, Merrimack discovered the French ships had sailed away during the night. Nereide sailed into the harbour and the capitulation took effect. Thinking that the French would return, Watkins asked the two American captains to cruise off the windward side of the island while Nereide secured the island. In ten days of cruising, the Americans captured only one French vessel before stopping off at Willemstad while on their return to Saint Kitts. Upon their return to Curaçao, the Americans discovered that Watkins had failed to keep his word, and instead of protecting American property, had embargoed forty-one ships in the harbor of which seven were American. Nereide commander also had impounded a large quantity of specie belonging to Consul Phillips and set privateers cruising with orders to seize American shipping. In his reports, Watkins completely ignored the assistance the Americans had provided in seizing the island and failed to even mention their presence during the action. Watkins's treatment of the Americans was not approved by British officials and upon the appointment of a new commander for the British Jamaica station he was stripped of his command and the specie he had seized was returned.

Notes

References
 
 

History of Curaçao
1800s in Curaçao and Dependencies
Curaçao
Curacao
Curaçao
1800 in France
1800 in the Dutch Empire
1800 in the United States
Curacao
Curacao
Curaçao
War of the Second Coalition
Curaçao